A "yo mama" joke is a reference to a person's mother through the use of phrases such as "your mother" or other regional variants, frequently used to insult the target by way of their mother. Used as an insult, "your mother..." preys on widespread sentiments of parental respect, making the insult particularly and globally offensive. "Your mother" can be combined with most types of insults, although suggestions of promiscuity are particularly common. Insults based on obesity, height, hairiness, laziness, incest, age, race, poverty, poor hygiene, unattractiveness, homosexuality, or stupidity may also be used. Compared to other types of insults, "your mother" insults are especially likely to incite violence. Slang variants such as "yo mama", "yo momma", "yer ma", "yer mum", "ya mum", "ya mom",  "ur mom", "your mum", "ur mum", "ur mother", "Joe mama", or "your mom" are sometimes used, depending on the local dialect. Insults involving "your mother" are commonly used when playing the Dozens.

Although the phrase has a long history of including a description portion, such as the old "your mother wears combat boots", the phrase "yo mama" by itself, without any qualifiers, has become commonly used as an all-purpose insult or an expression of defiance.

Historic examples
The first maternal insult written was written on a 3,500-year-old Babylonian stone tablet, written in Akkadian, with cuneiform as writing system. The tablet was found in 1976 by an archaeologist named J.J. van Dijk. The tablet was most likely written by a student, because it has multiple spelling and grammar errors. The tablet also contained multiple riddles and more jokes. Scholars Michael Streck and Nathan Wasserman studied the tablet and published their research and translations in the journal Iraq, put out by the British Institute for the Study of Iraq. Streck and Wasserman’s translation of this particular joke reads, “…of your mother is by the one who has intercourse with her. What/who is it?” Other riddles included topics like beer, sex, and politics.

William Shakespeare used such a device in Act I Scene 1 of Timon of Athens, implying that a character's mother is a "bitch":

Also in Act IV, Scene II of Shakespeare's Titus Andronicus, Aaron taunts his lover's sons:

An anti–Andrew Jackson newspaper said this of his mother:

See also

Fighting words
Flyting – related historical practices
Grass Mud Horse
Maledicta
Maledictology
Motherfucker
Russian mat
Dad joke

References

Explanatory notes 

Misogyny
Profanity
Popular culture language
Joke cycles